Lavar-e Razemi (also Romanized as Lāvar-e Razemī and Lāvar-e Sharqī) is a village in Markazi Rural District, in the Central District of Dashti County, Bushehr Province, Iran. At the 2006 census, its population was 806, in 187 families.

References 

Populated places in Dashti County